Samir Selešković (Turkish: Sedat Pınar; born 10 April 1970) is a former Bosnian professional basketball player and current assistant coach of Türk Telekom from Turkey. The former point guard is 1.88 m tall.

He began his stint as a Fenerbahçe Ülker assistant coach in the 2007–08 Turkish Basketball League season under the head coach Bogdan Tanjević (who led the Bosnian basketball club KK Bosna Sarajevo to the 1979 Euroleague Championship title).

He was a member of the Bosnia and Herzegovina national basketball team in EuroBasket 1993, EuroBasket 1995 Qualifying Round and EuroBasket 1997.

References

External links 
TBLStat.net Profile
Profile on eurobasket.com

1970 births
Living people
Beşiktaş men's basketball players
Bosnia and Herzegovina men's basketball players
Bosnia and Herzegovina emigrants to Turkey
Fenerbahçe basketball coaches
Oyak Renault basketball players
Tofaş S.K. players
Turkish basketball coaches
Turkish men's basketball players
Türk Telekom B.K. players
Point guards